This is the results breakdown of the local elections held in Asturias on 3 April 1979. The following tables show detailed results in the autonomous community's most populous municipalities, sorted alphabetically.

Overall

City control
The following table lists party control in the most populous municipalities, including provincial capitals (shown in bold).

Municipalities

Avilés
Population: 89,285

Gijón
Population: 253,294

Langreo
Population: 62,973

Mieres
Population: 62,513

Oviedo
Population: 179,866

San Martín del Rey Aurelio
Population: 29,073

Siero
Population: 39,179

References

Asturias
1979